The famous Pryvoz Market, located at 14 Pryvozna Street, is the largest food market in Odesa, Ukraine.

History

Pryvoz began in 1827, with wares sold from the back of horse-driven carts. The market was a large area where carts with goods that were sold at the local bazaar stopped. The place was a rather dirty, unpaved area, without capital buildings. Until the mid-1860s, the wheeler-dealers did not pay a market fee. Also, there was no own institution of measures and weights as in the ordinary market of those times.

Pryvoz adjoined the Stary (old) bazaar (also called the Volny (free) market), the first bazaar in Odesa. 

The market was burned due to the outbreak of the plague and rebuilt in 1902. In 1904, the only architectural monument was built here - the Fruit Passage. Designed by the famous city architect Fedir Nesturkh, the Passage featured covered shopping galleries with arched entrances.

In 2007 a meat and fish corps appeared, after which a shopping center called "New Pryvoz" was built.  the Odesa market is being restored and modified again, but it still does not lose its color and remains a place where they not only sell and buy, but also exchange the latest news.

Stories

In the 1940s zoo animals were moved from the Odesa zoo to Simferopol. Four-year-old elephant Murza (Мурза) escaped. It ran to the fruit section of the Pryvoz Market and ate several apples, pulled out pickled cucumbers from a barrel, and tasted some fresh cabbage and dried fruits. Murza was caught and returned to the zoo. A popular Soviet comedy film, Striped Trip was inspired by this incident.

In the 20s of the XX century, Pryvoz was led by the famous fraudster Jacob Pireman. One say he bought this post for a considerable bribe. Having become the head of the market, Pireman imposed a personal tribute to all merchants, and he also took hundreds of thousands of budget rubles to reconstruct the market and stole them. When Pireman's scam was uncovered, he was tried and shot. But one say that before the arrest, he hid a treasure - gold coins and diamonds on Pryvoz.

People

A western journalist explained his visit to the market:

Pryvoz was also mentioned in The Odesa Tales of Isaac Babel.

Notes

See also
Bazaar
 History of marketing
 Market (place)
 Retail

External links

Buildings and structures in Odesa
1827 establishments in the Russian Empire
Tourist attractions in Odesa
Retail markets in Ukraine